Drag is the first full-length album by the Red Aunts.  It was released in 1993 on Sympathy for the Record Industry.

Track listing
"Kung Fu Kitten" – 3:45
"Sleeping Pill" – 2:12
"Lethal Lolita" – 2:23
"Hot Rod" – 2:58
"Sleeping in the Wet Spot" – 2:44
"Route 66 Fucken 6" – 2:49
"Lonely Beer Drops" – 2:05
"Built for a Barstool" – 4:51
"Luz" – 2:13
"Teach Me to Kill" – 2:14
"My Cat Scratch" – 3:43
"Sweet Enough" – 2:34
"Fly Ford Comet/Ho Choice" – 2:05
"Sex Zombie" – 2:51
"Hard Hearted Hannah" – 5:27

Red Aunts albums
1993 debut albums